The 1959 All-SEC football team consists of American football players selected to the All-Southeastern Conference (SEC) chosen by various selectors for the 1959 NCAA University Division football season. Billy Cannon won the Heisman.

All-SEC selections

Ends
Jimmy Vickers, Georgia (AP-1, UP-1)
Larry Grantham, Ole Miss (AP-1, UPI-2)
Dave Hudson, Florida (AP-3, UPI-1)
Mickey Mangham, LSU (AP-2, UPI-3)
John Brewer, Ole Miss (AP-2)
Gerald Burch, Georgia Tech (UPI-2)
Lavalle White, Miss. St. (AP-3)
Cotton Letner, Tennessee (UPI-3)

Tackles
Ken Rice, Auburn (AP-1, UPI-1)
Joe Schaffer, Tennessee (AP-1, UPI-1)
Larry Wagner, Vanderbilt (AP-2)
Toby Deese, Georgia Tech (AP-2)
Bo Strange, LSU (UPI-2)
Walter Suggs, Miss. St. (UPI-2)
Lynn LeBlanc, LSU (AP-3)
Danny Royal, Florida (AP-3)
Larry Wagner, Vanderbilt (UPI-3)
Billy Shaw, Georgia Tech (UPI-3)

Guards
Marvin Terrell, Ole Miss (AP-1, UPI-1)
Zeke Smith, Auburn (AP-1, UPI-1)
Pat Dye, Georgia (AP-2, UPI-2)
Don Cochran, Alabama (AP-2, UPI-2)
Billy Roland, Georgia (AP-3)
Bob Talamiai, Kentucky (AP-3)
Richard Price, Ole Miss (UPI-3)
Ed McCreedy, LSU (UPI-3)

Centers
Maxie Baughan, Georgia Tech (AP-1, UPI-2)
Jackie Burkett, Auburn (AP-3, UPI-1)
Tom Goode, Miss. St. (AP-2, UPI-3)

Quarterbacks
Fran Tarkenton, Georgia (College Football Hall of Fame) (AP-1, UP-1)
Jake Gibbs, Ole Miss (AP-2, UPI-2)
Bobby Hunt, Auburn (AP-3, UPI-2)
Warren Rabb, LSU (UPI-2)
Charley Britt, Georgia (UPI-3)

Halfbacks
Billy Cannon, LSU (College Football Hall of Fame) (AP-1, UPI-1)
Tom Moore, Vanderbilt (AP-1, UPI-1)
Calvin Bird, Kentucky (AP-2, UPI-3)
Johnny Robinson, LSU (AP-3, UPI-2)
Bobby Walden, Georgia (AP-2)
Lamar Rawson, Auburn (AP-3)
Billy Majors, Tennessee (UPI-3)

Fullbacks
Charlie Flowers, Ole Miss (College Football Hall of Fame) (AP-1, UP-1)
Ed Dyas, Auburn (College Football Hall of Fame) (AP-2, UPI-3)
Taz Anderson, Georgia Tech (AP-3)

Key

AP = Associated Press

UPI = United Press International

Bold = Consensus first-team selection by both AP and UPI

See also
1959 College Football All-America Team

References

All-SEC
All-SEC football teams